Elba is an unincorporated community in Washington County, in the U.S. state of Ohio.

History
A post office called Elba was established in 1871, and remained in operation until 1984. The community most likely was named after Elba, an island in the Mediterranean Sea.

References

Unincorporated communities in Washington County, Ohio
Unincorporated communities in Ohio